Platonic division may refer to:

 The Analogy of the Divided Line, Plato's schematic representation of all possible metaphysics, epistemology, and ethics on four hierarchical levels in the Republic, Book 6 
 Plato's tripartite theory of soul, Plato's partitioned organization of the Soul as presented in the Phaedo and the Republic
 Plato's five regimes, Republic, Book 8, are Plato's forms of government Aristocracy, Timocracy, Oligarchy, Democracy, and Tyranny  
 Plato's Collection and Division or diairesis, a logical method of definition by division